Beebe School District is a public school district in Beebe, White County, Arkansas, United States. It serves Beebe, McRae, and El Paso.

On July 1, 2004, the McRae School District merged into the Beebe School District.

The Beebe School District was one of four Arkansas school districts recognized in the 4th Annual AP District Honor Roll as being honored for increasing access to AP course work while simultaneously maintaining or increasing the percentage of students earning scores of 3 or higher on Advanced Placement (AP) Exams from 2011 to 2013.

References

External links
 

Education in White County, Arkansas
School districts in Arkansas
Beebe, Arkansas